The Holly Bush is a public house at 75 Palmerston Street, Bollington, Macclesfield, Cheshire, England.  It is recorded in the National Heritage List for England as a designated Grade II listed building.

The public house is included in the Campaign for Real Ale's National Inventory of Historic Pub Interiors.  It was built in about 1935 and is a rare example of an almost intact "Brewer's Tudor" style pub from this period.

See also

Listed buildings in Bollington

References

Grade II listed pubs in Cheshire
National Inventory Pubs